Anne Marie Cummings is the first woman to receive Emmy nominations in the categories of acting, writing, and directing in a digital dramatic television series.

In 2015, Cummings moved to Los Angeles after spending 30 years in the theatre as a professional actress, playwright, director, and then artistic director of her own theatre company in Upstate New York. In its final year, Cummings moved her theatre company from a black box theatre into an independent movie theatre, and it was during this time that she began to film her own plays in a simplistic, one-shot format, as well as film the trailers for the plays she directed and staged at the movie theatre.

Cummings recognized she was merging her experiences from the theatre onto film so she moved to Los Angeles to continue to explore her style within the one-shot format. This quickly advanced into highly choreographed, 360 one-shot camera work for three seasons of the television series she created, wrote, and directed about an older woman and a much younger man called, “Conversations in L.A.”. “Conversations in L.A.” released on Amazon Prime,  iTunes, and ConversationsinLA.com from 2017-2019, and in October, 2019, FandangoNOW picked up all three seasons and released them on their platform.

Artistic career

Cummings grew up in Ft. Lauderdale, Florida, and began acting on stage at the age of six, and after performing in multiple professional plays by the age of 16, she attended the drama program at Carnegie Mellon University. During her summers at Carnegie, she continued to study acting at Northwestern University and the British American Drama Academy in Oxford, England (BADA). At BADA, she attended lectures with Simon Callow, Jeremy Irons, Peggy Ashcroft and John Gielgud. At Northwestern, she studied Anton Chekhov’s plays, in depth, with the master of Chekhov - the late Earle R. Gister.

Following her dramatic education, Cummings performed in regional theatres around the United States, but before that venture began, Peter Sylvester cast her in the role of Irina in “The Three Sisters,” by Anton Chekhov, at Synchronicity Space in New York City. Subsequently, she worked at the Alley Theatre in Houston, Texas, with director Gregory Boyd (“A Flea in Her Ear,” by Georges Feydeau), and with directors and writers Anne Bogart and Tina Landau (“American Vaudeville”). She then moved to Austin to perform in the role of Constanza in “Amadeus,” by Peter Schaffer and directed by Mark Ramont at the Capital City Playhouse, and to play the role of Puck in “A Midsummer Night’s Dream,’ directed by Anne Ciccolella at the Austin Shakespeare Festival.

Cummings then traveled to Seattle and created her first theatre company, The Immediate Theatre. She teamed up with fight choreographer, and theatre and opera director, Chuck Hudson, who directed her in the role of Gregor in an avant-garde production of “The Metamorphosis,” by Franz Kafka, and as Marie in “Woyzeck,” by Georg Büchner. Cummings enjoyed experimenting in the theatre and also teamed up with director Benji Bittle and played the role of Taylor (as a woman) from the play “K2,” by Patrick Meyers. For this production, a dance studio was turned into a mountain created by scaffolds, designed by Andrew Davidhazy, and Cummings trained for this role by summiting the 14,000 foot Mt. Rainier.

Cummings also performed with established companies in the Seattle area: AHA! Theatre, Alice B. Theatre, the Seattle Shakespeare Company, the Seattle Children’s Theatre, the Seattle Opera, and the Seattle Repertory Theatre where she worked with Tony Award-Winning director, Doug Hughes. Hughes directed Cummings in the black box and mainstage productions of “Voir Dire,” by Joe Sutton, as well as a reading of the play at the New York Theatre Workshop in NYC.

Mark Cuddy then cast and directed Cummings as Rosaura in “Life is a Dream,” by Pedro Calderon de la Barca at the Sacramento Theatre Company which inspired Edward Payson Call to cast Cummings as Antigone, in the Jean Anouih version of “Antigone” at the Cleveland Playhouse and GeVa Theatre. But it was at this point that Cummings moved back to New York City, and shifted her focus from acting to include playwriting and directing with performance readings of her plays “Helen of Purgatory,” “Touche!,” and “Extremes.” While Cummings directed most readings, she also worked with theatre directors Ludovica Villar-Hauser and Lucie Tiberghien. Performance readings of her plays took place all across the city: the Culture Project, the Cherry Lane, the Classic Stage Company, Vineyard Theatre, and SALAAM Theatre. Performance readings of her play “India Dreaming,” were directed by Leigh Fondakowski (“The Laramie Project”) and starred Indian movie stars, Madhur Jaffrey (“Vanya on 42nd Street”) and then Lillete Dubey (“Monsoon Wedding” and “The Best Exotic Marigold Hotel”). With further development, “India Dreaming” became “India Awaiting” and was performed Off-Broadway at the Samuel Beckett Theatre, starring Maulik Pancholy (“30 Rock” and “Weeds”), and directed by Tyler Marchant. Following the limited run of “India Awaiting,” Cummings made another shift – she moved to Ithaca, in Upstate New York, to focus more intensely on her writing and directing.
 
To make a living, Cummings worked as a columnist and journalist. As a columnist, she created the controversial column, “Instant Message” (for Gannett publications). This column interviewed youth and was written in first person as monologues about teens personal issues from eating disorders, to family dysfunction, to being bullied at school, to relationships, to school and learning, and so on. Also for Gannett, she wrote food reviews called, “Ithaca Eats,” and for Tompkins Weekly, she wrote breaking news stories, each featuring her own photography.
 
Yet during this time, Cummings continued writing plays. She wrote a new play, “Sinkhole,” and had more performance readings of her play “Extremes” (a reading was held at Primary Stages, in NYC, starred Michael Cullen, “Dead Man Walking” and Jessica Blank, “The Exonerated”). She also made major revisions to “Helen of Purgatory” which then became the play “Purgatory Row” (with a performance reading starring Steppenwolf theatre actress, Kate Buddeke). She also created her second theatre company, The Readers’ Theatre of Ithaca, which started in a book store and moved from one black box theatre after another with performance readings of modern plays such as “Oleanna,” by David Mamet, “The Mercy Seat,” by Neil LaBute, and “Detroit,” by Lisa D’Amour.
 
However, it was when Cummings moved The Readers’ Theatre of Ithaca into Cinemapolis, the only independent movie theatre in Ithaca, that she began dabbling with theatre on film, as she called it. She wrote her play, “Soul Mates,” and filmed it in one-take at a diner. She then wrote and filmed a short called, “Easy Prey,” with each scene being filmed in one-take. For The Readers’ Theatre of Ithaca, Cummings began to film trailers for the modern plays she directed which continued to be performed on a small stage she brought into one of the movie theatres. But it was after one year at Cinemapolis that Cummings decided to move to Los Angeles, CA, so that she could merge all of her experiences from the theatre as an actress, writer, director, artistic director, and producer, with her unique, one-shot vision for television and film.

Awards and nominations 
 2017 44th Daytime Emmy Awards
Outstanding Lead Actress in a Digital Daytime Drama Series – Anne Marie Cummings (Nominated)
 2017 6th HollyWeb Festival
Outstanding Digital Drama Series – Conversations in L.A. – Anne Marie Cummings (Nominated)
 2018 45th Daytime Emmy Awards
Outstanding Writing in a Digital Drama Series – Anne Marie Cummings (Nominated and Presenter at Emmy Award Ceremony)
 2018 9th New Media Film Festival
Outstanding Trailer in a Digital Drama Series – Conversations in L.A. – Anne Marie Cummings (Nominated)
 2019 46th Daytime Emmy Awards
Outstanding Writing in a Digital Daytime Drama Series – Anne Marie Cummings (Nominated and Presenter at Emmy Award Ceremony)
Outstanding Directing in a Digital Daytime Drama Series – Anne Marie Cummings (Nominated and Presenter at Emmy Award Ceremony)
 2019 10th Indie Series Awards
BEST DIRECTING – ANNE MARIE CUMMINGS (WINNER)
Best Writing – Anne Marie Cummings (Nominated)
Best Lead Actress – Anne Marie Cummings (Nominated)
 2019 40th Telly Awards
BEST SCRIPTED SERIES - ANNE MARIE CUMMINGS (BRONZE WINNER)

Critical Reception for Conversations in L.A.
After Season One, the Huffington Post wrote, “Anne Marie Cummings is a force and Hollywood has taken note. As Creator, Cummings dares to go there. As Writer, Cummings is brilliant. As Actress, Cummings draws the audience in with each raw, real and authentic performance. As Director, Cummings commands nothing but  the best from the entire cast.” TV Grapevine wrote, "Anne Marie is the epitome of a strong powerful woman. Not only is she a triple threat (acting, directing and writing), but she is someone who stays humble and down to earth." USA Today wrote, "Anne Marie is living proof that it's never too late to chase the dream, whatever that may be." USA Today also wrote, "The finished product is...a study in the art of art." Emmy Magazine said of the show, "...beautifully choreographed." In an interview with AXS TV, Lou Diamond Phillips said of Anne Marie Cummings’ writing, "It reminded me a bit of Mamet. It reminded me a bit of Tarantino. There's just some great conversational musicality to it...incredibly well-structured and compelling from line to line." In the same interview, Lou Diamond Phillips said, "At this point in my career, after 40 years as a professional and 30 years in Hollywood, there are not many things where I can say, 'I've never done anything quite like that.'" Hollywood Alert wrote that Anne Marie Cummings, "...is the first woman to receive Emmy nominations for Digital Series Acting, Writing, and Directing." Vents Magazine wrote that the show is, "...deep, real, and unforgettable." Carlos Sottomayor Magazine wrote the series is, "A funny and witty series." In an article by Stareable, it was written that, "Cummings’ theatre background is clear in their format." After Season Three, Grit Daily wrote, "Conversations in L.A. is worth discussing."“Anne Marie Cummings is phenomenal! If you’ve never heard about her - - now’s your chance! She is the first woman to receive Emmy nominations in the digital drama categories of Acting, Writing, and Directing, and all for the three seasons of her Amazon Prime digital drama series about an older woman who falls in love with a much younger man called CONVERSATIONS IN L.A.” – The Frank Magazine, UK

Theatre, Acting

Theatre, Directing & Writing

Short Films, Writer & Director

References

External links
 
 

Living people
American television directors
1967 births